This is a list of butterflies of Guinea. About 583 species are known from Guinea, seven of which are endemic.

Papilionidae

Papilioninae

Papilionini
Papilio antimachus Drury, 1782
Papilio zalmoxis Hewitson, 1864
Papilio nireus Linnaeus, 1758
Papilio chrapkowskoides nurettini Koçak, 1983
Papilio sosia Rothschild & Jordan, 1903
Papilio dardanus Brown, 1776
Papilio phorcas Cramer, 1775
Papilio zenobia Fabricius, 1775
Papilio cyproeofila Butler, 1868
Papilio demodocus Esper, [1798]
Papilio horribilis Butler, 1874
Papilio menestheus Drury, 1773

Leptocercini
Graphium antheus (Cramer, 1779)
Graphium policenes (Cramer, 1775)
Graphium liponesco (Suffert, 1904)
Graphium angolanus baronis (Ungemach, 1932)
Graphium leonidas (Fabricius, 1793)
Graphium tynderaeus (Fabricius, 1793)
Graphium latreillianus (Godart, 1819)
Graphium adamastor (Boisduval, 1836)
Graphium almansor dufranei Collins & Larsen, 2008

Pieridae

Pseudopontiinae
Pseudopontia paradoxa (Felder & Felder, 1869)

Coliadinae
Eurema brigitta (Stoll, [1780])
Eurema desjardinsii marshalli (Butler, 1898)
Eurema regularis (Butler, 1876)
Eurema hapale (Mabille, 1882)
Eurema hecabe solifera (Butler, 1875)
Eurema senegalensis (Boisduval, 1836)
Catopsilia florella (Fabricius, 1775)

Pierinae
Colotis antevippe (Boisduval, 1836)
Colotis euippe (Linnaeus, 1758)
Colotis evagore antigone (Boisduval, 1836)
Nepheronia argia (Fabricius, 1775)
Nepheronia pharis (Boisduval, 1836)
Nepheronia thalassina (Boisduval, 1836)
Leptosia alcesta (Stoll, [1782])
Leptosia hybrida Bernardi, 1952
Leptosia medusa (Cramer, 1777)

Pierini
Appias epaphia (Cramer, [1779])
Appias sabina (Felder & Felder, [1865])
Mylothris aburi Larsen & Collins, 2003
Mylothris chloris (Fabricius, 1775)
Mylothris hilara (Karsch, 1892)
Mylothris poppea (Cramer, 1777)
Mylothris schumanni Suffert, 1904
Mylothris dimidiata Aurivillius, 1898
Belenois aurota (Fabricius, 1793)
Belenois calypso (Drury, 1773)
Belenois creona (Cramer, [1776])
Belenois hedyle ianthe (Doubleday, 1842)
Belenois subeida (Felder & Felder, 1865)
Belenois theora (Doubleday, 1846)

Lycaenidae

Miletinae

Liphyrini
Euliphyra hewitsoni Aurivillius, 1899
Aslauga guineensis Collins & Libert, 1997

Miletini
Spalgis lemolea lemolea Druce, 1890
Spalgis lemolea pilos Druce, 1890
Lachnocnema emperamus (Snellen, 1872)
Lachnocnema vuattouxi Libert, 1996

Poritiinae

Liptenini
Ptelina carnuta (Hewitson, 1873)
Pentila abraxas (Westwood, 1851)
Pentila bennetti Collins & Larsen, 2003
Pentila hewitsoni (Grose-Smith & Kirby, 1887)
Pentila pauli abri Collins & Larsen, 2001 (manuscript name)
Pentila petreoides Bethune-Baker, 1915
Pentila preussi preussi Staudinger, 1888
Pentila preussi fayei Stempffer, 1963
Ornipholidotos issia Stempffer, 1969
Mimacraea neurata Holland, 1895
Liptena albicans Cator, 1904
Liptena alluaudi Mabille, 1890
Liptena ferrymani bigoti Stempffer, 1964
Liptena ferrymani bissau Collins & Larsen, 2003
Liptena griveaudi Stempffer, 1969
Liptena helena (Druce, 1888)
Liptena septistrigata (Bethune-Baker, 1903)
Liptena similis (Kirby, 1890)
Liptena simplicia Möschler, 1887
Liptena xanthostola coomassiensis Hawker-Smith, 1933
Kakumia otlauga (Grose-Smith & Kirby, 1890)
Tetrarhanis diversa (Bethune-Baker, 1904)
Falcuna leonensis Stempffer & Bennett, 1963
Larinopoda eurema (Plötz, 1880)
Eresina maesseni Stempffer, 1956
Eresiomera isca occidentalis Collins & Larsen, 1998
Citrinophila similis (Kirby, 1887)

Epitolini
Epitola posthumus (Fabricius, 1793)
Epitola uranioides occidentalis Libert, 1999
Cerautola crowleyi (Sharpe, 1890)
Cerautola miranda (Staudinger, 1889)
Stempfferia leonina (Staudinger, 1888)
Stempfferia michelae Libert, 1999
Cephetola cephena (Hewitson, 1873)
Epitolina dispar (Kirby, 1887)
Epitolina melissa (Druce, 1888)
Aethiopana honorius divisa (Butler, 1901)
Hewitsonia boisduvalii (Hewitson, 1869)
Hewitsonia occidentalis Bouyer, 1997

Aphnaeinae
Pseudaletis malangi Collins & Larsen, 1995
Pseudaletis leonis (Staudinger, 1888)
Pseudaletis richardi Stempffer, 1952
Lipaphnaeus leonina (Sharpe, 1890)
Cigaritis avriko (Karsch, 1893)
Cigaritis iza (Hewitson, 1865)
Cigaritis mozambica (Bertoloni, 1850)
Cigaritis nilus (Hewitson, 1865)
Zeritis neriene Boisduval, 1836
Axiocerses harpax (Fabricius, 1775)
Axiocerses amanga borealis Aurivillius, 1905
Aphnaeus jefferyi Hawker-Smith, 1928
Aphnaeus orcas (Drury, 1782)

Theclinae
Myrina silenus (Fabricius, 1775)
Myrina subornata Lathy, 1903
Oxylides faunus (Drury, 1773)
Dapidodigma hymen (Fabricius, 1775)
Hypolycaena anara Larsen, 1986
Hypolycaena antifaunus (Westwood, 1851)
Hypolycaena dubia Aurivillius, 1895
Hypolycaena hatita Hewitson, 1865
Hypolycaena liara Druce, 1890
Hypolycaena philippus (Fabricius, 1793)
Hypolycaena scintillans Stempffer, 1957
Iolaus eurisus eurisus (Cramer, 1779)
Iolaus eurisus helius (Fabricius, 1781)
Iolaus aethria Karsch, 1893
Iolaus leonis (Riley, 1928)
Iolaus djaloni Collins & Larsen, 1998
Iolaus iasis Hewitson, 1865
Iolaus maesa (Hewitson, 1862)
Iolaus moyambina (Stempffer & Bennett, 1959)
Iolaus normani meamui Collins & Larsen, 2005
Iolaus menas Druce, 1890
Iolaus alcibiades Kirby, 1871
Iolaus calisto (Westwood, 1851)
Iolaus mane Collins & Larsen, 2003
Iolaus timon (Fabricius, 1787)
Iolaus catori Bethune-Baker, 1904
Iolaus kyabobo Larsen, 1996
Stugeta marmoreus (Butler, 1866)
Pilodeudorix catori (Bethune-Baker, 1903)
Pilodeudorix leonina (Bethune-Baker, 1904)
Pilodeudorix otraeda (Hewitson, 1863)
Pilodeudorix caerulea (Druce, 1890)
Pilodeudorix camerona (Plötz, 1880)
Pilodeudorix diyllus diyllus (Hewitson, 1878)
Pilodeudorix diyllus occidentalis Libert, 2004
Pilodeudorix zela (Hewitson, 1869)
Pilodeudorix aucta (Karsch, 1895)
Pilodeudorix violetta (Aurivillius, 1897)
Paradeudorix eleala viridis (Stempffer, 1964)
Paradeudorix eleala parallela (Collins & Larsen, 2000)
Paradeudorix petersi (Stempffer & Bennett, 1956)
Hypomyrina mimetica Libert, 2004
Deudorix antalus (Hopffer, 1855)
Deudorix dinochares Grose-Smith, 1887
Deudorix dinomenes diomedes Jackson, 1966
Deudorix galathea (Swainson, 1821)
Deudorix lorisona lorisona (Hewitson, 1862)
Deudorix lorisona abriana Libert, 2004
Deudorix odana Druce, 1887

Polyommatinae

Lycaenesthini
Anthene amarah (Guérin-Méneville, 1849)
Anthene crawshayi (Butler, 1899)
Anthene definita (Butler, 1899)
Anthene irumu (Stempffer, 1948)
Anthene juba (Fabricius, 1787)
Anthene larydas (Cramer, 1780)
Anthene liodes (Hewitson, 1874)
Anthene lunulata (Trimen, 1894)
Anthene princeps (Butler, 1876)
Anthene rubricinctus (Holland, 1891)
Anthene starki Larsen, 2005
Anthene sylvanus (Drury, 1773)
Anthene chryseostictus (Bethune-Baker, 1910)
Anthene lusones fulvimacula (Mabille, 1890)
Anthene hades (Bethune-Baker, 1910)
Anthene lamias (Hewitson, 1878)
Anthene nigeriae (Aurivillius, 1905)
Cupidesthes lithas (Druce, 1890)

Polyommatini
Cupidopsis cissus (Godart, [1824])
Cupidopsis jobates mauritanica Riley, 1932
Pseudonacaduba sichela (Wallengren, 1857)
Lampides boeticus (Linnaeus, 1767)
Uranothauma belcastroi Larsen, 1997
Uranothauma falkensteini (Dewitz, 1879)
Phlyaria cyara stactalla Karsch, 1895
Cacyreus audeoudi Stempffer, 1936
Cacyreus lingeus (Stoll, 1782)
Cacyreus virilis Stempffer, 1936
Leptotes babaulti (Stempffer, 1935)
Leptotes brevidentatus (Tite, 1958)
Leptotes jeanneli (Stempffer, 1935)
Leptotes pirithous (Linnaeus, 1767)
Tuxentius carana kontu (Karsch, 1893)
Tarucus rosacea (Austaut, 1885)
Tarucus ungemachi Stempffer, 1942
Zizeeria knysna (Trimen, 1862)
Zizina antanossa (Mabille, 1877)
Azanus jesous (Guérin-Méneville, 1849)
Azanus mirza (Plötz, 1880)
Azanus moriqua (Wallengren, 1857)
Azanus isis (Drury, 1773)
Eicochrysops dudgeoni Riley, 1929
Eicochrysops hippocrates (Fabricius, 1793)
Euchrysops albistriata greenwoodi d'Abrera, 1980
Euchrysops malathana (Boisduval, 1833)
Euchrysops osiris (Hopffer, 1855)
Euchrysops reducta Hulstaert, 1924
Thermoniphas micylus (Cramer, 1780)
Oboronia guessfeldti (Dewitz, 1879)
Oboronia ornata (Mabille, 1890)
Oboronia punctatus (Dewitz, 1879)
Lepidochrysops labeensis Larsen & Warren-Gash, 2000
Lepidochrysops parsimon (Fabricius, 1775)
Lepidochrysops synchrematiza (Bethune-Baker, [1923])

Riodinidae

Nemeobiinae
Abisara tantalus (Hewitson, 1861)

Nymphalidae

Libytheinae
Libythea labdaca Westwood, 1851

Danainae

Danaini
Danaus chrysippus alcippus (Cramer, 1777)
Tirumala petiverana (Doubleday, 1847)
Amauris niavius (Linnaeus, 1758)
Amauris tartarea Mabille, 1876
Amauris damocles (Fabricius, 1793)
Amauris hecate (Butler, 1866)

Satyrinae
Melanitini
Gnophodes betsimena parmeno Doubleday, 1849
Melanitis leda (Linnaeus, 1758)
Melanitis libya Distant, 1882

Satyrini
Bicyclus abnormis (Dudgeon, 1909)
Bicyclus angulosa (Butler, 1868)
Bicyclus auricruda (Butler, 1868)
Bicyclus campus (Karsch, 1893)
Bicyclus dekeyseri (Condamin, 1958)
Bicyclus dorothea (Cramer, 1779)
Bicyclus ephorus Weymer, 1892
Bicyclus evadne (Cramer, 1779)
Bicyclus funebris (Guérin-Méneville, 1844)
Bicyclus ignobilis (Butler, 1870)
Bicyclus istaris (Plötz, 1880)
Bicyclus madetes (Hewitson, 1874)
Bicyclus mandanes Hewitson, 1873
Bicyclus milyas (Hewitson, 1864)
Bicyclus nobilis (Aurivillius, 1893)
Bicyclus pavonis (Butler, 1876)
Bicyclus procora (Karsch, 1893)
Bicyclus safitza (Westwood, 1850)
Bicyclus martius (Fabricius, 1793)
Bicyclus sandace (Hewitson, 1877)
Bicyclus sangmelinae Condamin, 1963
Bicyclus taenias (Hewitson, 1877)
Bicyclus trilophus jacksoni Condamin, 1961
Bicyclus vulgaris (Butler, 1868)
Bicyclus xeneas occidentalis Condamin, 1965
Bicyclus zinebi (Butler, 1869)
Hallelesis halyma (Fabricius, 1793)
Heteropsis elisi (Karsch, 1893)
Heteropsis peitho (Plötz, 1880)
Ypthima antennata cornesi Kielland, 1982
Ypthima asterope (Klug, 1832)
Ypthima doleta Kirby, 1880
Ypthima pupillaris Butler, 1888
Ypthimomorpha itonia (Hewitson, 1865)

Charaxinae

Charaxini
Charaxes varanes vologeses (Mabille, 1876)
Charaxes fulvescens senegala van Someren, 1975
Charaxes candiope (Godart, 1824)
Charaxes protoclea Feisthamel, 1850
Charaxes boueti Feisthamel, 1850
Charaxes lucretius Cramer, [1775]
Charaxes lactetinctus Karsch, 1892
Charaxes jasius Poulton, 1926
Charaxes epijasius Reiche, 1850
Charaxes castor (Cramer, 1775)
Charaxes brutus (Cramer, 1779)
Charaxes pollux (Cramer, 1775)
Charaxes eudoxus eudoxus (Drury, 1782)
Charaxes eudoxus goubandana Nicat, 2002
Charaxes numenes (Hewitson, 1859)
Charaxes tiridates (Cramer, 1777)
Charaxes smaragdalis butleri Rothschild, 1900
Charaxes imperialis Butler, 1874
Charaxes ameliae doumeti Henning, 1989
Charaxes hadrianus Ward, 1871
Charaxes nobilis claudei le Moult, 1933
Charaxes fournierae jolybouyeri Vingerhoedt, 1998
Charaxes zingha (Stoll, 1780)
Charaxes etesipe (Godart, 1824)
Charaxes achaemenes atlantica van Someren, 1970
Charaxes eupale (Drury, 1782)
Charaxes anticlea (Drury, 1782)
Charaxes virilis van Someren & Jackson, 1952
Charaxes etheocles (Cramer, 1777)
Charaxes plantroui , 1975
Charaxes cedreatis Hewitson, 1874
Charaxes viola Butler, 1866
Charaxes northcotti Rothschild, 1899
Charaxes pleione (Godart, 1824)
Charaxes paphianus falcata (Butler, 1872)
Charaxes nichetes leopardinus Plantrou, 1974
Charaxes lycurgus (Fabricius, 1793)
Charaxes zelica Butler, 1869
Charaxes porthos gallayi van Someren, 1968

Euxanthini
Euxanthe eurinome (Cramer, 1775)

Pallini
Palla ussheri (Butler, 1870)
Palla decius (Cramer, 1777)
Palla violinitens (Crowley, 1890)

Apaturinae
Apaturopsis cleochares (Hewitson, 1873)

Nymphalinae
Kallimoides rumia (Doubleday, 1849)
Vanessula milca (Hewitson, 1873)

Nymphalini
Vanessa cardui (Linnaeus, 1758)
Junonia chorimene (Guérin-Méneville, 1844)
Junonia hierta cebrene Trimen, 1870
Junonia oenone (Linnaeus, 1758)
Junonia orithya madagascariensis Guenée, 1865
Junonia sophia (Fabricius, 1793)
Junonia stygia (Aurivillius, 1894)
Junonia terea (Drury, 1773)
Junonia westermanni Westwood, 1870
Junonia cymodoce (Cramer, 1777)
Salamis cacta (Fabricius, 1793)
Protogoniomorpha parhassus (Drury, 1782)
Protogoniomorpha cytora (Doubleday, 1847)
Precis antilope (Feisthamel, 1850)
Precis ceryne ceruana Rothschild & Jordan, 190
Precis coelestina Dewitz, 1879
Precis frobeniusi Strand, 1909
Precis octavia (Cramer, 1777)
Precis pelarga (Fabricius, 1775)
Precis sinuata Plötz, 1880
Hypolimnas anthedon (Doubleday, 1845)
Hypolimnas aubergeri Hecq, 1987
Hypolimnas misippus (Linnaeus, 1764)
Catacroptera cloanthe ligata Rothschild & Jordan, 1903

Cyrestinae

Cyrestini
Cyrestis camillus (Fabricius, 1781)

Biblidinae

Biblidini
Byblia anvatara crameri Aurivillius, 1894
Mesoxantha ethosea (Drury, 1782)
Neptidopsis ophione (Cramer, 1777)
Eurytela dryope (Cramer, [1775])

Epicaliini
Sevenia umbrina (Karsch, 1892)

Limenitinae

Limenitidini
Harma theobene Doubleday, 1848
Cymothoe adela Staudinger, 1890
Cymothoe althea (Cramer, 1776)
Cymothoe aubergeri Plantrou, 1977
Cymothoe caenis (Drury, 1773)
Cymothoe fumana (Westwood, 1850)
Cymothoe hartigi Belcastro, 1990
Cymothoe jodutta (Westwood, 1850)
Cymothoe mabillei Overlaet, 1944
Cymothoe sangaris (Godart, 1824)
Pseudoneptis bugandensis ianthe Hemming, 1964
Pseudacraea boisduvalii (Doubleday, 1845)
Pseudacraea eurytus (Linnaeus, 1758)
Pseudacraea lucretia (Cramer, [1775])
Pseudacraea semire (Cramer, 1779)
Pseudacraea warburgi Aurivillius, 1892

Neptidini
Neptis alta Overlaet, 1955
Neptis najo Karsch, 1893
Neptis kiriakoffi Overlaet, 1955
Neptis melicerta (Drury, 1773)
Neptis metella (Doubleday, 1848)
Neptis morosa Overlaet, 1955
Neptis nebrodes Hewitson, 1874
Neptis nemetes Hewitson, 1868
Neptis quintilla Mabille, 1890
Neptis serena Overlaet, 1955

Adoliadini
Catuna crithea (Drury, 1773)
Euryphura chalcis (Felder & Felder, 1860)
Hamanumida daedalus (Fabricius, 1775)
Aterica galene (Brown, 1776)
Cynandra opis (Drury, 1773)
Euriphene ampedusa (Hewitson, 1866)
Euriphene atossa (Hewitson, 1865)
Euriphene coerulea Boisduval, 1847
Euriphene gambiae gambiae Feisthamel, 1850
Euriphene gambiae vera Hecq, 2002
Euriphene simplex (Staudinger, 1891)
Euriphene veronica (Stoll, 1780)
Bebearia osyris (Schultze, 1920)
Bebearia absolon (Fabricius, 1793)
Bebearia mandinga (Felder & Felder, 1860)
Bebearia barce (Doubleday, 1847)
Bebearia mardania (Fabricius, 1793)
Bebearia cocalia (Fabricius, 1793)
Bebearia senegalensis (Herrich-Schaeffer, 1858)
Bebearia sophus sophus (Fabricius, 1793)
Bebearia sophus phreone (Feisthamel, 1850)
Bebearia arcadius (Fabricius, 1793)
Bebearia laetitia (Plötz, 1880)
Bebearia phantasina phantasina (Staudinger, 1891)
Bebearia phantasina ultima Hecq, 1990
Bebearia demetra (Godart, 1824)
Euphaedra medon pholus (van der Hoeven, 1840)
Euphaedra gausape (Butler, 1866)
Euphaedra judith Weymer, 1892
Euphaedra melpomene aubergeriana Hecq, 1981
Euphaedra hastiri Hecq, 1981
Euphaedra pallas Hecq, 2004
Euphaedra xypete (Hewitson, 1865)
Euphaedra hebes Hecq, 1980
Euphaedra diffusa albocoerulea Hecq, 1976
Euphaedra crockeri (Butler, 1869)
Euphaedra eusemoides (Grose-Smith & Kirby, 1889)
Euphaedra cyparissa nimbina Pyrcz & Warren-Gash, 2013
Euphaedra sarcoptera ferrea Pyrcz & Warren-Gash, 2013
Euphaedra sarcoptera sarcoptera (Butler, 1871)
Euphaedra themis (Hübner, 1807)
Euphaedra dubreka Collins & Larsen, 2005
Euphaedra laboureana laboureana de Toulgëot, 1957
Euphaedra laboureana eburnensis Hecq, 1979
Euphaedra modesta Hecq, 1982
Euphaedra janetta (Butler, 1871)
Euphaedra aberrans Staudinger, 1891
Euphaedra occulta Hecq, 1982
Euphaedra ceres (Fabricius, 1775)
Euphaedra inanum (Butler, 1873)
Euphaedra phaethusa aurea Hecq, 1983
Euphaedra villiersi Condamin, 1964
Euphaedra tenebrosa Hecq, 1983
Euphaedra eleus (Drury, 1782)
Euphaedra edwardsii (van der Hoeven, 1845)
Euphaedra perseis (Drury, 1773)
Euphaedra harpalyce (Cramer, 1777)
Euphaedra eupalus (Fabricius, 1781)
Euptera dorothea dorothea Bethune-Baker, 1904
Euptera dorothea warrengashi Libert, 2002
Pseudathyma falcata Jackson, 1969
Pseudathyma neptidina Karsch, 1894
Pseudathyma plutonica sibyllina (Staudinger, 1890)

Heliconiinae

Acraeini
Acraea camaena (Drury, 1773)
Acraea endoscota Le Doux, 1928
Acraea neobule Doubleday, 1847
Acraea quirina (Fabricius, 1781)
Acraea zetes (Linnaeus, 1758)
Acraea egina (Cramer, 1775)
Acraea caecilia (Fabricius, 1781)
Acraea pseudegina Westwood, 1852
Acraea rogersi Hewitson, 1873
Acraea alcinoe Felder & Felder, 1865
Acraea macaria (Fabricius, 1793)
Acraea umbra carpenteri (Le Doux, 1937)
Acraea vestalis Felder & Felder, 1865
Acraea acerata Hewitson, 1874
Acraea alciope Hewitson, 1852
Acraea pseudepaea Dudgeon, 1909
Acraea bonasia (Fabricius, 1775)
Acraea encedana Pierre, 1976
Acraea encedon (Linnaeus, 1758)
Acraea serena (Fabricius, 1775)
Acraea jodutta (Fabricius, 1793)
Acraea peneleos Ward, 1871
Acraea polis Pierre, 1999
Acraea pharsalus Ward, 1871
Acraea vesperalis Grose-Smith, 1890
Acraea parrhasia (Fabricius, 1793)

Vagrantini
Lachnoptera anticlia (Hübner, 1819)
Phalanta eurytis (Doubleday, 1847)
Phalanta phalantha aethiopica (Rothschild & Jordan, 1903)

Hesperiidae

Coeliadinae
Coeliades aeschylus (Plötz, 1884)
Coeliades bixana Evans, 1940
Coeliades chalybe (Westwood, 1852)
Coeliades forestan (Stoll, [1782])
Coeliades hanno (Plötz, 1879)
Coeliades pisistratus (Fabricius, 1793)
Pyrrhochalcia iphis (Drury, 1773)

Pyrginae

Celaenorrhinini
Celaenorrhinus galenus (Fabricius, 1793)
Celaenorrhinus leona Berger, 1975
Celaenorrhinus meditrina (Hewitson, 1877)
Celaenorrhinus proxima maesseni Berger, 1976
Celaenorrhinus rutilans (Mabille, 1877)
Eretis lugens (Rogenhofer, 1891)
Eretis melania Mabille, 1891
Eretis plistonicus (Plötz, 1879)
Sarangesa bouvieri (Mabille, 1877)
Sarangesa brigida (Plötz, 1879)
Sarangesa laelius (Mabille, 1877)
Sarangesa majorella (Mabille, 1891)
Sarangesa phidyle (Walker, 1870)
Sarangesa tertullianus (Fabricius, 1793)
Sarangesa thecla (Plötz, 1879)

Tagiadini
Tagiades flesus (Fabricius, 1781)
Eagris decastigma Mabille, 1891
Eagris denuba (Plötz, 1879)
Eagris hereus quaterna (Mabille, 1890)
Eagris subalbida (Holland, 1893)
Eagris tetrastigma subolivescens (Holland, 1892)
Calleagris lacteus dannatti (Ehrmann, 1893)
Caprona adelica Karsch, 1892
Netrobalane canopus (Trimen, 1864)
Abantis bismarcki Karsch, 1892
Abantis elegantula (Mabille, 1890)
Abantis leucogaster (Mabille, 1890)
Abantis lucretia Druce, 1909
Abantis nigeriana Butler, 1901
Abantis pseudonigeriana Usher, 1984

Carcharodini
Spialia diomus (Hopffer, 1855)
Spialia dromus (Plötz, 1884)
Spialia ploetzi occidentalis de Jong, 1977
Spialia spio (Linnaeus, 1764)
Gomalia elma (Trimen, 1862)

Hesperiinae

Aeromachini
Astictopterus abjecta (Snellen, 1872)
Astictopterus anomoeus (Plötz, 1879)
Prosopalpus debilis (Plötz, 1879)
Prosopalpus saga Evans, 1937
Prosopalpus styla Evans, 1937
Gorgyra aretina (Hewitson, 1878)
Gorgyra diversata Evans, 1937
Gorgyra heterochrus (Mabille, 1890)
Gorgyra minima Holland, 1896
Gorgyra subfacatus (Mabille, 1890)
Gyrogra subnotata (Holland, 1894)
Teniorhinus watsoni Holland, 1892
Ceratrichia clara Evans, 1937
Ceratrichia nothus (Fabricius, 1787)
Ceratrichia phocion (Fabricius, 1781)
Ceratrichia semilutea Mabille, 1891
Pardaleodes edipus (Stoll, 1781)
Pardaleodes incerta murcia (Plötz, 1883)
Pardaleodes sator (Westwood, 1852)
Pardaleodes tibullus (Fabricius, 1793)
Xanthodisca rega (Mabille, 1890)
Rhabdomantis galatia (Hewitson, 1868)
Rhabdomantis sosia (Mabille, 1891)
Osmodes adon (Mabille, 1890)
Osmodes costatus Aurivillius, 1896
Osmodes distincta Holland, 1896
Osmodes laronia (Hewitson, 1868)
Osmodes lindseyi occidentalis Miller, 1971
Osmodes omar Swinhoe, 1916
Osmodes thora (Plötz, 1884)
Parosmodes morantii axis Evans, 1937
Osphantes ogowena (Mabille, 1891)
Acleros mackenii olaus (Plötz, 1884)
Acleros ploetzi Mabille, 1890
Semalea arela (Mabille, 1891)
Semalea pulvina (Plötz, 1879)
Semalea sextilis (Plötz, 1886)
Hypoleucis tripunctata Mabille, 1891
Meza cybeutes volta Miller, 1971
Meza elba (Evans, 1937)
Meza leucophaea (Holland, 1894)
Meza mabea (Holland, 1894)
Meza mabillei (Holland, 1893)
Meza meza (Hewitson, 1877)
Paronymus budonga (Evans, 1938)
Paronymus nevea (Druce, 1910)
Paronymus xanthias (Mabille, 1891)
Andronymus caesar (Fabricius, 1793)
Andronymus hero Evans, 1937
Zophopetes cerymica (Hewitson, 1867)
Zophopetes quaternata (Mabille, 1876)
Gamia shelleyi (Sharpe, 1890)
Artitropa comus (Stoll, 1782)
Mopala orma (Plötz, 1879)
Gretna waga (Plötz, 1886)
Pteroteinon caenira (Hewitson, 1867)
Pteroteinon laufella (Hewitson, 1868)
Pteroteinon pruna Evans, 1937
Leona leonora (Plötz, 1879)
Leona halma Evans, 1937
Caenides soritia (Hewitson, 1876)
Caenides dacela (Hewitson, 1876)
Caenides hidaroides Aurivillius, 1896
Caenides dacena (Hewitson, 1876)
Monza alberti (Holland, 1896)
Monza cretacea (Snellen, 1872)
Melphina noctula (Druce, 1909)
Fresna cojo (Karsch, 1893)
Fresna netopha (Hewitson, 1878)
Fresna nyassae (Hewitson, 1878)
Platylesches affinissima Strand, 1921
Platylesches batangae (Holland, 1894)
Platylesches chamaeleon (Mabille, 1891)
Platylesches galesa (Hewitson, 1877)
Platylesches moritili (Wallengren, 1857)
Platylesches picanini (Holland, 1894)
Platylesches robustus fofi Larsen & Mei, 1998
Platylesches rossii Belcastro, 1986

Baorini
Pelopidas mathias (Fabricius, 1798)
Pelopidas thrax (Hübner, 1821)
Borbo borbonica (Boisduval, 1833)
Borbo fallax (Gaede, 1916)
Borbo fanta (Evans, 1937)
Borbo fatuellus (Hopffer, 1855)
Borbo gemella (Mabille, 1884)
Borbo holtzi (Plötz, 1883)
Borbo perobscura (Druce, 1912)
Parnara monasi (Trimen & Bowker, 1889)
Gegenes hottentota (Latreille, 1824)
Gegenes niso brevicornis (Plötz, 1884)
Gegenes pumilio gambica (Mabille, 1878)

Heteropterinae
Metisella tsadicus (Aurivillius, 1905)

See also 
 List of moths of Guinea
 Wildlife of Guinea

References

Seitz, A. Die Gross-Schmetterlinge der Erde 13: Die Afrikanischen Tagfalter. Plates
Seitz, A. Die Gross-Schmetterlinge der Erde 13: Die Afrikanischen Tagfalter. Text 

Guinea
Guinea
Guinea
Guinea
Butterflies